Kunkle is a census-designated place in southeastern Madison Township, Williams County, Ohio, United States.

It has a post office with the ZIP code 43531.  It is located along Williams County Road 17, just south of Williams County Road O.

Kunkle was not officially platted. A post office called Kunkle has been in operation since 1880.

Kunkle is mentioned in the Stephen King novel The Stand as a camping location for Redman and company on their way to Nebraska.

References

Census-designated places in Ohio
Census-designated places in Williams County, Ohio